The Drop is the 24th novel by American crime author Michael Connelly, and the fifteenth novel featuring Los Angeles Police Department (LAPD) detective Harry Bosch. The book was published on 22 November 2011.

The novel was referenced in an October 2010 interview, in which Connelly indicated that he'd like to release "'bookend' novels next year, the second one a Bosch book". Connelly's first novel of 2011 was the Mickey Haller novel The Fifth Witness.

The plot finds Bosch juggling two investigations: one an old cold-case murder that was reactivated by a new lead from DNA evidence, and the other the death of a politically-connected power broker in a fall from a hotel balcony.

Plot
The book was mentioned in a February 2011 interview, where Connelly explained that Bosch would be "handling two cases at once, a cold case that turns hot and the politically charged investigation into the death of a city councilman's son. The city councilman happens to be Harry's old nemesis, Irvin Irving."

Bosch and his partner David Chu are working in the Open-Unsolved unit of the LAPD's homicide squad handling cold cases. Based on a new analysis of old physical evidence, they are assigned to investigate the 1989 murder of college student Lily Price who was strangled to death, probably with a belt. DNA from a small blood smear on her body is matched to recently-paroled child sex abuser Clayton Pell. However Pell was only eight years old when Price died, all but eliminating him as a suspect in the murder and raising the possibility of contamination at the crime lab. Bosch and Chu track Pell to a halfway house for sex offenders, where they meet therapist Hannah Stone. Due to his experience with sexual homicides Bosch is initially dismissive of Stone's professional efforts. However, he soon reconsiders and decides Stone's attempts to help offenders reduce their recidivism rate is a worthwhile career. Pell agrees to an interview, reporting that during his childhood his mother dated a man known as "Chill" who sexually abused him and beat him with a belt -- accounting for the transfer of his blood to Price's body. Bosch and Stone are attracted to each other, and begin a romantic relationship, much to the approval of Bosch's teenage daughter Maddie. After years of living alone, Bosch gained custody of Maddie after her mother's death. She demonstrates keen observational skills and expresses an interest in being a police officer. 

The Price investigation is sidetracked by the death of attorney and business consultant George Irving in a fall from a hotel room balcony at Chateau Marmont. George is the son of Irvin Irving, formerly Bosch's nemesis at LAPD, now a city council member and Bosch's frequent foe in power struggles and political gamesmanship. Irving specifically requests Bosch to investigate his son's death because, despite their personal antipathy, he believes Bosch is a dedicated detective who will find out the truth no matter what. Due to some unusual marks on George's body indicating he'd been in a choke hold shortly before his death, Bosch initially suspects homicide. He hypothesizes that the death came as part of a scheme to discredit a company that was in competition for a highly lucrative city-approved taxi license. Soon after George took on one taxi company as a client, their competing company was faced with numerous traffic citations that appeared to have been orchestrated by George Irving. Some of Irvin's old enemies stand to suffer financial losses in the taxi license disputes. Bosch believes a former police officer and now co-owner of a taxi company sneaked into George's room and incapacitated him before tossing the body from the balcony. Chu leaks details of the case to a reporter at the Los Angeles Times in a misguided attempt to impress her, enraging Bosch and making him question Chu's integrity. However, additional investigation reveals that George killed himself. George Irving was assaulted, but it occurred hours before his death. The suspect intended to confront George about the taxi scheme, but discovered George's suicidal plan and incapacitated him with a choke hold to flee the scene. In addition to this discovery, more details about George's life begin to come to light. George Irving's only friendship had ended as a result of his backroom political dealing, he was experiencing depression caused by his son leaving for college, and his marriage was ending. In fact, he rented the same hotel room where he and his wife spent their honeymoon. George's wife had concealed this detail out of shame and to protect their son from the ugly truth. Irvin Irving refuses to believe Bosch's findings, leading to a showdown meeting with city and police leaders where Bosch implicates Irving in the taxi-license scheme and Irving demands a review of Bosch. 

Bosch and Chu return to the Price investigation, identifying "Chill" as Chilton Hardy, Jr., a man with a minor criminal history. Based on Price being strangled with a belt, and Pell's story of Hardy beating him with a belt, they think Hardy is a strong suspect for the Price murder. They track down Hardy's ailing father at a townhouse, and he claims to have no idea where his son might be. A brief search of the townhouse finds evidence that Hardy killed his father and has stolen his identity. Upon arrest, Hardy admits his identity and confesses to the Price murder along with 36 other homicides. A search of the adjacent townhouse, also registered to Hardy's father, finds evidence of Hardy's crimes including photographs and home movies of his rapes. A task force is convened to handle the massive amounts of evidence in the townhouse, and to deal with the inevitable criticism of Hardy's crimes going undiscovered for decades. 

Pell orchestrates a revenge scheme after learning that Hardy will never be charged for his child sex abuse. Pell attacks a police officer and is sent to the same jail where Hardy is being held. As both men are transferred on a bus to court for arraignment hearings, Pell attacks and seriously wounds Hardy. Bosch intuits Pell's scheme and saves Hardy's life, but later wonders if he should have let Pell kill Hardy. Bosch receives a warning from his former partner Kiz Rider who now works as an assistant to the LAPD chief: the Hardy case must be delayed until after an upcoming election, in efforts to prevent Irving from being re-elected. Irving's many political enemies want to see him defeated; they hope the taxi-licensing scandal will harm his prospects and want to temporarily suppress the Hardy case to keep the taxi scandal in the news. Bosch finds such political maneuvering distasteful, but knows it's part of the job and feels content knowing Hardy will never be free. Bosch and Chu eventually reconcile, after Bosch's temper cools and Chu makes some impressive discoveries during the investigations and also comes to Bosch's defense during the showdown with Irving.

References

Drop
Drop
Drop
Drop
Little, Brown and Company books